Gordon Glacier is an Antarctic glacier of at least  in length flowing in a northerly direction beginning in the Crossover Pass, flowing through the Shackleton Range to finally meet the Slessor Glacier. The glacier was first mapped in 1957 by the CTAE, and named after George Patrick Pirie-Gordon, 15th Laird of Buthlaw (died 4 April 2011), who was a member of the Committee of Management and treasurer of the CTAE between 1955 and 1958.

See also
 List of glaciers in the Antarctic
 Glaciology

References

Glaciers of Coats Land